Mauja Masti is an Indian music television channel. Mastiii Mujhawas launched by TV Vision Private Limited which is a fully owned subsidiary of Sri Adhikari Brothers Television. By viewership count, it was among the top five channels in the Hindi music category after just one month of launch.

References

External links
Official website

Music television channels in India
Indian music mass media
Television channels and stations established in 2016